Windows NT 3.x may refer to either of, or all of the following versions of Microsoft Windows:

 Windows NT 3.1
 Windows NT 3.5
 Windows NT 3.51

3.x